Psychophony: An Experiment in Evil is a 2012 Spanish horror thriller film directed by Xavier Berraondo, starring Ferran Albiol and

Cast
 Ferran Albiol as Quino
  as Kai
 Ferran Carvagal as Sergi
 Mercè Montalà as Dra. Jara
 Miriam Planas as Lis
 Clàudia Pons as Ainara
 Babeth Ripoll as Graciela
 Leyla Rodríguez as Luz

Reception
Mark L. Miller of Ain't it Cool News wrote a positive review of the film, writing that "Whether you are a believer or not, despite some soap operatic performances, PSYCHOPHONY is downright scary when it uses its supposed real footage." Jeremy Blitz of DVD Talk wrote a mixed review of the film, writing that "It's not awful, but not terribly impressive." Joel Harley of Starburst rated the film 6 stars out of 10, calling it "merely middling, inoffensive and a little cheap."

The film received a rating of 2 out of 5 in Horror Society.

References

External links
 
 

Spanish horror thriller films
2012 horror thriller films